The Appalachian Athletic Conference (AAC) is a college athletic conference affiliated with the National Association of Intercollegiate Athletics (NAIA). Members of the conference are located in the Southeastern United States in Tennessee, Kentucky, Georgia, South Carolina, North Carolina, and Virginia.

History

The conference is the successor to the Volunteer State Athletic Conference (VSAC), which began in the 1940s; and later the Tennessee-Virginia Athletic Conference (TVAC) that operated during the 1980s and 1990s. The Appalachian Athletic Conference was formed in 2000 with the additions of members from Virginia, Kentucky, and North Carolina. In 2019 the conference added Kentucky Christian University as a full member and Savannah College of Art and Design as an associate member in men's and women's lacrosse.

Bluefield College was a member of the AAC from 2000 until 2012 when it left to join the Mid-South Conference. On March 3, 2014, Bluefield announced that it would return to the AAC in fall 2014.

Chronological timeline
 2000 - In 2000, the Appalachian Athletic Conference (AAC) was founded from the remnants of the Tennessee-Virginia Athletic Conference (TVAC). Charter members included Bryan College, Brevard College, King College (now King University), Milligan College (now Milligan University), Tennessee Wesleyan College (now Tennessee Wesleyan University), Virginia Intermont College, and the University of Virginia–Wise (UVa Wise); as well as the additions of Alice Lloyd College, Bluefield College (now Bluefield University), and Montreat College, beginning the 2000-01 academic year
 2002 - Union College joined the AAC in the 2002-03 academic year.
 2005 - Alice Lloyd left the AAC to re-join the Kentucky Intercollegiate Athletic Conference (KIAC; now the River States Conference) after the 2004–05 academic year.
 2006 - Brevard left the AAC and the NAIA to join the Division II ranks of the National Collegiate Athletic Association (NCAA) as an NCAA D-II Independent (to later join the South Atlantic Conference, beginning in the 2008–09 academic year) after the 2005–06 academic year.
 2009 - Covenant left the AAC and the NAIA to join the NCAA Division III ranks as an NCAA D-III Independent (to later join the Great South Athletic Conference (GSAC), beginning the 2010–11 academic year) after the 2008–09 academic year.
 2009 - King (Tenn.) left the AAC to become an NAIA Independent (to later join the NCAA Division II ranks as an NCAA D-II Independent during the 2010–11 academic year; before join Conference Carolinas, beginning the 2011–12 academic year) after the 2008–09 academic year.
 2009 - Reinhardt College (now Reinhardt University) joined the AAC in the 2009–10 academic year.
 2010 - UVa Wise left the AAC to join the Mid-South Conference (MSC) after the 2009–10 academic year.
 2011 - Columbia College and Point University (formerly Atlanta Christian College) joined the AAC in the 2011–12 academic year.
 2012 - Bluefield left the AAC to join the Mid-South after the 2011–12 academic year.
 2012 - St. Andrews University (formerly St. Andrews Presbyterian College) and the Savannah College of Art and Design at Atlanta joined the AAC in the 2012–13 academic year.
 2013 - Truett McConnell University joined the AAC in the 2013–14 academic year.
 2014 - Virginia Intermont left the AAC when the school announced its closure after the 2013–14 academic year.
 2014 - Bluefield re-joined back to the AAC in the 2014–15 academic year.
 2015 - Asbury University and the University of the Cumberlands joined the AAC as affiliate members for men's and women's lacrosse in the 2016 spring season (2015–16 academic year).
 2016 - West Virginia University Institute of Technology (West Virginia Tech) joined the AAC as an affiliate member for men's and women's swimming in the 2016–17 academic year.
 2016 - Allen University joined the AAC in the 2016–17 academic year.
 2017 - Brenau University joined the AAC in the 2017–18 academic year.
 2017 - Georgetown College joined the AAC as an affiliate member for women's lacrosse, while West Virginia Tech added men's wrestling to its AAC affiliate membership, both effective in the 2017–18 academic year.
 2018 - Cumberlands (Ky.) and Georgetown (Ky.) left the AAC as affiliate members for women's lacrosse to compete in their primary home conference in the Mid-South (where they began sponsoring that sport) after the 2017–18 academic year.
 2018 - Columbia International University joined the AAC in the 2018–19 academic year.
 2019 - Asbury left the AAC as an affiliate member for men's lacrosse as the school announced to discontinue the sport in mid-season after the 2019 spring season (2018–19 academic year).
 2019 - Kentucky Christian University joined the AAC in the 2019–20 academic year.
 2019 - Savannah College of Art and Design at Savannah joined the AAC as an affiliate member for men's and women's lacrosse in the 2020 spring season (2019–20 academic year).
 2020 - Allen left the AAC and the NAIA to join the NCAA Division II ranks and to re-join the Southern Intercollegiate Athletic Conference (SIAC) after the 2019–20 academic year.
 2020 - Webber International University joined the AAC as an affiliate member for men's lacrosse in the 2021 spring season (2020–21 academic year).
 2021 - Asbury left the AAC as an affiliate member for women's lacrosse, men's and women's swimming after the 2020–21 academic year.
 2021 - The Tennessee campus of Johnson University joined the AAC in the 2021–22 academic year.
 2021 - Keiser University joined the AAC as an affiliate member for men's lacrosse in the 2022 spring season (2021–22 academic year).
 2022 - Seven institutions will join the AAC as affiliate members: Life University for men's volleyball and men's wrestling; Warner University and Webber International for men's volleyball; Keiser, Brewton-Parker College, St. Thomas University, and Southeastern University for men's wrestling, beginning the 2022–23 academic year. Point announced its departure from the conference in 2023–24 for the Southern States Athletic Conference (SSAC) and will be replaced by University of Pikeville from Mid-South. The AAC will begin sponsor football, with core members Bluefield, Kentucky Christian, Point, Reinhardt, St. Andrews, and Union (Ky.) in the 2022 fall season (2022–23 academic year).

Member schools

Current members
The AAC currently has 16 full members, all are private schools. It is the largest conference in the NAIA:

Notes

Future member
The AAC will have one future full member for the 2023–24 school year:

Notes

Affiliate members
The AAC currently has ten affiliate members, all but one are private schools:

Notes

Former members
The AAC had seven former full members, all but one were private schools:

Notes

Former affiliate members
The AAC had two former affiliate members, both were private schools:

Notes

Membership timeline

Conference sports
The Appalachian Athletic Conference currently fields 24 sports (13 men's and 11 women's):

Notes

References

External links
 

 
Articles which contain graphical timelines